Lopesi may refer to:
 the former name of Katarraktis, a mountain village in Achaea, Greece
 Lopesi Faagu (born 1960), weightlifter from American Samoa

In biology:
Adejeania lopesi, a species of tachinid fly found in Brazil
 Austrodiscus lopesi, a fossil species of air-breathing land snail in the family Charopidae, found in Brazil
 Cnemidochroma lopesi, a species of beetle in the family Cerambycidae, found in Brazil
 Corethrella lopesi, a species of midge in the genus Corethrella in the family Corethrellidae
Culex lopesi, a species of mosquito; see List of Culex species
 Grajahua lopesi, a species of robber fly in the family Asilidae; see List of Asilidae species: G
 Hapljapyx lopesi, a species of dipluran in the genus Hapljapyx in the family Japygidae
 Heniartes lopesi, a species of assassin bug in the genus Heniartes in the family Reduviidae
 Hexatoma lopesis, a species of crane fly in the genus Hexatoma in the family Limoniidae
 Hypsolebias lopesi, a species of rivuline (killifish) in the genus Hypsolebias
 Ischnochiton lopesi, a species of polyplacophoran mollusc in the family Ischnochitonidae; see List of marine molluscs of Brazil
 Leptopteromyia lopesi, a species of robber fly in the genus Leptopteromyia in the family Asilidae; see List of Asilidae species: L
 Megalobulimus lopesi, a species of air-breathing land snail in the family Strophocheilidae, endemic to Brazil
 Moenkhausia lopesi, a species of tetra (fish) in the genus Moenkhausia
 Pegoscapus lopesi, a species of fig wasp in the genus Pegoscapus
 Philornis lopesi, a species of fly in the genus Philornis
 Pritchardia lopesi, a species of robber fly in the genus Pritchardia in the family Asitidae; see List of Asilidae species: P
 Succinea lopesi, a species of air-breathing land snail in the family Succineidae; see List of non-marine molluscs of Brazil
 Syringogaster lopesi, a species of ant-mimicking fly in the genus Syringogaster

See also 
 Bradypterus lopezi (AKA Evergreen forest warbler), a species of bird
 Poliolais lopezi (AKA White-tailed warbler), a species of bird